Benxi Manchu Autonomous County (Mölendroff: bensi manju beye dasangga siyan) is an autonomous county under the administration of the prefecture-level city of Benxi, in the east of Liaoning province, China.

The city is home to a sizable Manchu and Hui population.

Administrative divisions
There is one subdistrict, 11 towns, and one townships within the county:

The only subdistrict is Guanyinge Subdistrict

Towns:
Xiaoshi, Tianshifu, Caohekou, Lianshanguan, Qinghecheng, Nandian, Jianchang, Caohecheng, Pianling, Caohezhang, Gaoguan

The only township is Dongyingfang Township

References

External links
Benxi Manchu Autonomous County Government website (Chinese)

County-level divisions of Liaoning
Manchu autonomous counties
Benxi Manchu Autonomous County
Benxi